Fort Pitt Regiment was an American soccer club based in Pittsburgh, Pennsylvania. Founded in 2013, the team played its first season in 2014 as a member of the National Premier Soccer League (NPSL) in the Great Lakes Conference of the Midwest Region. The team was named following a name the team contest that included West Penn United and Pittsburgh Rebellion as the other two options. The team ended play in 2018 and was replaced next season by the Pittsburgh Hotspurs as the Pittsburgh area's NPSL club.

Players
as of May 17, 2016

Notable former players
This list of notable former players comprises players who went on to play professional soccer after playing for the team in the NPSL, or those who previously played professionally before joining the team.

  Nick Kolarac 
  Neco Brett
  Anthony Virgara
  Jamie Luchini

Honors

Domestic League
Midwest Region - Great Lakes East Conference (NPSL)
Champions (1): 2014

Year-by-year

Rivalries
Fort Pitt Regiment had rivalries with other Great Lakes region NPSL clubs, including Cleveland SC and the Erie Commodores FC.

Stadia
 Montour High School (2014–2015)

References

External links
Official team site

Association football clubs established in 2013
Association football clubs disestablished in 2018
National Premier Soccer League teams
Soccer clubs in Pittsburgh
Defunct Pittsburgh sports teams
2013 establishments in Pennsylvania
2018 disestablishments in Pennsylvania